Edmondston may refer to:

Arthur Edmondston (1776–1841), Scottish writer and doctor
Laurence Edmondston (1795–1879), British-born naturalist and doctor, brother of Arthur
Thomas Edmondston (1825–1846), British-born botanist, son of Laurence